VV Alverna is a football club from Wijchen, Netherlands. VV Alverna plays in the 2017–18 Sunday Eerste Klasse after it relegated from the Hoofdklasse in 2017.

References

External links
 Official site

Football clubs in the Netherlands
Association football clubs established in 1950
1950 establishments in the Netherlands
Multi-sport clubs in the Netherlands
Football clubs in Wijchen